John E. Wilson (1927 – January 11, 2019), popularly known as Jumpin' Johnny Wilson, was an American basketball and baseball player. He gained his nickname for being the only player on his high school team able to dunk the basketball.

Playing career

As a high school student in Anderson, Indiana at Anderson High School, Anderson he captained the Indians basketball team and was named Indiana's Mr. Basketball. In the high school championship game in 1946, he scored 30 of his team's 67 points in its victory over Fort Wayne Central High School, a record.

Wilson wished to attend Indiana University after he graduated in 1946, but was not recruited due to the Big Ten's unspoken policy of not recruiting African-American players. Instead, Wilson attended Anderson University, where he quickly became a star player.  During his three-year career at Anderson, Wilson earned eleven letters, was selected All-conference three times, team M.V.P. three times, named as an All-American twice, and once finished third in the nation in scoring. As of 2008, Wilson still held the school record for career scoring average, season scoring average, and field goal attempts in a game.

After leaving Anderson College, Wilson played baseball for one year with the Chicago American Giants in the Negro leagues before playing basketball for the Harlem Globetrotters from 1949 to 1954. Wilson later returned to Anderson University in 1970 to finish earning his bachelor's degree in education.

Coaching career

Wilson spent eight years at head basketball coach at Wood High School in Indianapolis, then sixteen years as head coach and athletic director at Malcolm X College, compiling a 378-135 (.737) record.  Afterwards, Wilson worked as an assistant coach for Anderson College and Anderson High School. Wilson was the assistant basketball coach at Lock Haven University aside his son John E. Wilson Jr.

Wilson Sr. later moved to Virginia until the time of his death on January 11, 2019.

Legacy

Wilson was the subject of the book "Jump Johnny Jump!" written by Dick Burdette.

Wilson was inducted into the Indiana Basketball Hall of Fame and the Anderson University Athletic Hall of Fame. He was named one of Indiana's 50 best basketball players of all time.

References

1927 births
2019 deaths
American men's basketball coaches
American men's basketball players
Anderson Ravens baseball players
Anderson Ravens men's basketball players
Baseball players from Indiana
Basketball coaches from Indiana
Basketball players from Indiana
Chicago American Giants players
College men's basketball head coaches in the United States
Harlem Globetrotters players
High school basketball coaches in the United States
Junior college athletic directors in the United States
Anderson High School (Anderson, Indiana) alumni
20th-century African-American sportspeople
21st-century African-American people